Arman Aziz (born 10 May 1984) is a Bangladeshi former footballer who played as a midfielder for the Bangladesh national team. He is currently serving as team manager for Chittagong Abahani, the last club he played for.

Club career
Arman entered competitive football with Chittagong Premier League for Bakulia XI. He then joined the Fakirpool Youngmen's Club. He came to the top flight playing for Muktijoddha Sangsad KC in 2003. He played for the country's top two teams Dhaka Mohammedan and Dhaka Abahani. Mohammedan won four trophies under his captaincy. He came to prominence during the 2005–06 National Football Championship, which he won with Mohammedan. Arman, won four titles in five seasons at Mohammedan. In 2016, he joined his hometown side Chittagong Abahani. He declared his retirement from football on 22 February 2017 after playing for Chittagong Abahani against Dhaka Mohammedan SC in 2017 Sheikh Kamal International Club Cup match at the MA Aziz Stadium.

International career
Arman captained the Bangladesh U23s at the 2006 Asian Games.

Arman made his senior international debut for Bangladesh, on 10 December 2005. It was a group stage match of 2005 South Asian Football Federation Gold Cup against Nepal. He earned 32 caps for Bangladesh from 2005 to 2009, however had to retire from international duty in 2010, due to an injury. The injury denied Arman from repeating his club heroics on an international stage.

After retirement
After Arman's retirement, he is keeping himself involved with football in a different role. In 2018, he became the team leader of Saif SC youth teams. Since October 2018, he is serving for Bangladesh Premier League side Chittagong Abahani, his hometown club, as team manager.

Honours

Club
Muktijoddha Sangsad KC
Bangladesh Federation Cup: 2003
Dhaka Mohammedan
National Football Championship: 2005
Bangladesh Super Cup: 2009
Bangladesh Federation Cup: 2009, 2008

Chittagong Abahani
Independence Cup: 2016

References

External links 
 
 

1984 births
Living people
Bangladeshi footballers
Bangladesh international footballers
Association football midfielders
Footballers at the 2006 Asian Games
Asian Games competitors for Bangladesh
Muktijoddha Sangsad KC players
Abahani Limited (Dhaka) players